Epiretinal membrane or macular pucker is a disease of the eye in response to changes in the vitreous humor or more rarely, diabetes. Sometimes, as a result of immune system response to protect the retina, cells converge in the macular area as the vitreous ages and pulls away in posterior vitreous detachment (PVD). PVD can create minor damage to the retina, stimulating exudate, inflammation, and leucocyte response. These cells can form a transparent layer gradually and, like all scar tissue, tighten to create tension on the retina which may bulge and pucker, or even cause swelling or macular edema. Often this results in distortions of vision that are clearly visible as bowing and blurring when looking at lines on chart paper (or an Amsler grid) within the macular area, or central 1.0 degree of visual arc. Usually it occurs in one eye first, and may cause binocular diplopia or double vision if the image from one eye is too different from the image of the other eye. The distortions can make objects look different in size (usually larger = macropsia), especially in the central portion of the visual field, creating a localized or field dependent aniseikonia that cannot be fully corrected optically with glasses. Partial correction often improves the binocular vision considerably though. In the young (under 50 years of age), these cells occasionally pull free and disintegrate on their own; but in the majority of those affected (over 60 years of age) the condition is permanent. The underlying photoreceptor cells, rod cells and cone cells, are usually not damaged unless the membrane becomes quite thick and hard; so usually there is no macular degeneration.

Cause

The source of the cells in epiretinal membranes (ERM) has been found to comprise glial cells, retinal pigment epithelial (RPE) cells, macrophages, fibrocytes, and collagen cells. These cells are found in varying proportions. Those from retinal breaks, previous retinal detachments, or cryopexy are composed mainly of dispersed RPE cells, while cells of glial origin predominate in idiopathic pathology. Laminocytes are the fundamental cell type in idiopathic ERMs. These cells are frequently found in small and dispersed numbers in eyes containing a PVD. The presence of retinal pigment cells invariably indicates proliferative retinopathy and is only seen in association with a retinal detachment or tear.

The incidence of associated PVD range from 75 to 93%, and PVD is present in virtually all eyes with retinal breaks or retinal detachments and subsequent ERM formation. PVD can lead to retinal breaks that may liberate RPE cells that initiate membrane formation. Small breaks in the internal limiting membrane (ILM) after PVD also may provide retinal astrocytes access to the vitreous cavity, where they may subsequently proliferate. Many ERM also have ILM fragments that may be peeled separately. Finally, vitreous hemorrhage, inflammation, or both associated with a PVD also may stimulate ERM formation.

Both sexes appear to be affected equally frequently.

Diagnosis
Epiretinal membrane is typically diagnosed by appearance with optical coherence tomography (OCT) of the macula. Features include a thickening of the nerve fiber layer, a serrated appearance to the surface of the retina just beneath a thickened layer of glial tissue at the retinal-vitreous interface.

Prevention
There is no good evidence for any preventive actions, since it appears this is a natural response to aging changes in the vitreous. It has been estimated that Posterior vitreous detachment (PVD) occurs in over 75 percent of the population over age 65, that PVD is essentially a harmless condition (although with some disturbing symptoms), and that it does not normally threaten sight. However, since epiretinal membrane appears to be a protective response to PVD, where inflammation, exudative fluid, and scar tissue is formed, it is possible that NSAIDs may reduce the inflammation response. Usually there are flashing light experiences and the emergence of floaters in the eye that herald changes in the vitreous before the epiretinal membrane forms.

Treatment
Surgeons can remove or peel the membrane through the sclera and improve vision by 2 or more Snellen lines. Usually the vitreous is replaced at the same time with clear (BSS) fluid, in a vitrectomy. Surgery is not usually recommended unless the distortions are severe enough to interfere with daily living. For milder cases, nutritional supplements can reduce epiretinal membrane.
For severe epiretinal membrane, surgery may be recommended, however  there are the usual hazards of surgery, infections, and a possibility of retinal detachment. More common complications are high intraocular pressure, bleeding in the eye, and cataracts, which are the most frequent complication of vitrectomy surgery. Many patients will develop a cataract within the first few years after surgery. In fact, the visual distortions and diplopia created by cataracts may sometimes be confused with epiretinal membrane.

Epidemiology
This ocular pathology was first described by Iwanoff in 1865, and it has been shown to occur in about 7% of the population. It can occur more frequently in the older population with postmortem studies showing it in 2% of those aged 50 years and 20% in those aged 75 years.

Culture
In 1996, Spalding Gray (June 5, 1941 – ca. January 10, 2004), an American actor, screenwriter and playwright, released Gray's Anatomy, a film monologue describing his experiences dealing with a macular pucker and his decision to undergo surgery.

In the 2011 film Paul, Ruth had Epiretinal membrane complicated by macular edema in her left vitreous cavity.

See also
Eye surgery

References

Additional references

External links 

 Macular Pucker Resource Guide from the National Eye Institute (NEI).

Disorders of choroid and retina